, the x86 architecture is used in most high end compute-intensive computers, including cloud computing, servers, workstations, and many less powerful computers, including personal computer desktops and laptops. The ARM architecture is used in most other product categories, especially high-volume battery powered mobile devices such as smartphones and tablet computers.
 
Some Xeon Phi processors support four-way hyper-threading, effectively quadrupling the number of threads. Before the Coffee Lake architecture, most Xeon and all desktop and mobile Core i3 and i7 supported hyper-threading while only dual-core mobile i5's supported it. Post Coffee Lake, increased core counts meant hyper-threading is not needed for Core i3, as it then replaced the i5 with four physical cores on the desktop platform. Core i7, on the desktop platform no longer supports hyper-threading; instead, now higher-performing core i9s will support hyper-threading on both mobile and desktop platforms. Before 2007 and post-Kaby Lake, some Intel Pentiums support hyper-threading. Celeron and Atom processors never supported it.

Intel processors table

See also 

Intel Corporation
List of Intel processors
List of Intel Atom processors
List of Intel Itanium processors
List of Intel Celeron processors
List of Intel Pentium processors
List of Intel Pentium Pro processors
List of Intel Pentium II processors
List of Intel Pentium III processors
List of Intel Pentium 4 processors
List of Intel Pentium D processors
List of Intel Pentium M processors
List of Intel Xeon processors
List of Intel Core processors
List of Intel Core 2 processors
List of Intel Core i3 processors
List of Intel Core i5 processors
List of Intel Core i7 processors
List of Intel Core i9 processors
List of Intel CPU microarchitectures
List of AMD processors
List of AMD CPU microarchitectures
Table of AMD processors
List of AMD graphics processing units
List of Intel graphics processing units
List of Nvidia graphics processing units

External links
 Intel- Intel Source for Specification of Intel Processor
 Comparison Charts for Intel Core Desktop Processor Family
 Intel -  Microprocessor Quick Reference Guide

Intel
Comparison
Intel processors